Kenneth Raymond Rosewarne (11 November 1911 – 22 November 1987) was an Australian rules footballer who played with Collingwood in the Victorian Football League (VFL).

Notes

External links 

		
Ken Rosewarne's profile at Collingwood Forever

1911 births
1987 deaths
Australian rules footballers from Victoria (Australia)
Collingwood Football Club players
Ivanhoe Amateurs Football Club players